Sir John Houstoun of that Ilk, 2nd Baronet (or Houston; died December 1717) was a member of the Parliament of Scotland for Renfrewshire from 1685 to 1686 and 1702 to 1707 and for Stirlingshire in 1689 then from 1689 to 1702.

He was the son of Sir Patrick Houstoun, 1st Baronet of that Ilk, who he succeeded to the baronetcy in 1696.

Sir John married Lady Anne (3 March 1671 – April 1738), daughter of John Drummond, 1st Earl of Melfort and Sophia, daughter of Robert Maitland. She was the heiress of Lundin. Their son and his successor, Sir John Houston, 3rd Baronet of that Ilk, M.P.

Notes

References

Baronets in the Baronetage of Nova Scotia
Members of the Parliament of Scotland 1685–1686
Members of the Convention of the Estates of Scotland 1689
Members of the Parliament of Scotland 1689–1702
Members of the Parliament of Scotland 1702–1707
Shire Commissioners to the Parliament of Scotland
Scottish knights
1717 deaths